Vinko Soldo (born 15 February 1998) is a Croatian football player who plays as centre-back for NK Slaven Belupo.

Club career

Early career
In 2009, Soldo joined GNK Dinamo Zagreb youth academy when he was a young child from NK Dubrava. He was one of the brightest talents of a very interesting generation of Dinamo Zagreb players born in 1998, including Josip Brekalo, Nikola Moro, Borna Sosa, Branimir Kalaica and Adrian Šemper.

Dinamo Zagreb
On 12 January 2016, Soldo has signed his first professional contract with Dinamo Zagreb. He made his league debut on 6 May 2016 against NK Slaven Belupo at Gradski stadion which Dinamo Zagreb won 3-0. In this match, he played 33 minutes, after he was substituted for Alexandru Mățel. In 2015/16 Season that Soldo made professional debut, Dinamo Zagreb achieved double:league and cup.

In July 2018, he joined Rudeš on loan until December 2018.

Slaven Belupo
On 14 July 2021, Soldo returned to Slaven Belupo after playing there on loan previously and signed a two-year contract.

International career
Soldo has represented his country at various age groups, most recently for the Croatia national under-19 football team. In 2015, he played 2015 UEFA European Under-17 Championship and 2015 FIFA U-17 World Cup as one of the key players. Since March 2016, he has been member of Croatia national under-19 football team.

Club career statistics

Honours

Club

Dinamo Zagreb
Croatian First Football League (1): 2015–16
Croatian Football Cup (1): 2015–16

Kuopion Palloseura KuPS
Veikkausliiga: 2019

References

External links
 

1998 births
Living people
Footballers from Zagreb
Association football central defenders
Croatian footballers
Croatia youth international footballers
Croatia under-21 international footballers
GNK Dinamo Zagreb players
NK Lokomotiva Zagreb players
HNK Cibalia players
NK Rudeš players
Kuopion Palloseura players
NK Slaven Belupo players
Diósgyőri VTK players
Croatian Football League players
First Football League (Croatia) players
Veikkausliiga players
Nemzeti Bajnokság I players
Croatian expatriate footballers
Expatriate footballers in Finland
Croatian expatriate sportspeople in Finland
Expatriate footballers in Hungary
Croatian expatriate sportspeople in Hungary